Louis Stanislas Xavier Verroust (10 May 1814 – 9 or 11 April 1863) was a French composer and oboist.

Biographical sketch
Verroust was born in Hazebrouck. He received a second prize in Gustave Vogt's class in oboe in 1833, followed by a first prize in the next year. Also a fine violinist, he became second violinist in the orchestra of the Palais-Royal in 1831.

He taught oboe at the Conservatoire de Paris from 1853 to 1860, succeeding Gustave Vogt in this position and preceding Charles Triébert.

Verroust's published compositions, many of which included parts for oboe, numbered around 85 (Op. 85, his next-to-last concert solo, was published posthumously, possibly Op. 86 as well).

He died on either 9 or 11 April 1863, also in Hazebrouck.

References

External links

Essay on the 12 Oboe Concertos of Stanislas Verroust (concerns the 12 Solos de Concert for oboe with piano or quartet by Verroust published by Richault between 1858 and 1864)

1814 births
1863 deaths
19th-century classical composers
19th-century French composers
19th-century French male musicians
Academic staff of the Conservatoire de Paris
Conservatoire de Paris alumni
French classical oboists
French male classical composers
French Romantic composers
Male oboists
People from Hazebrouck